She Was Only a Grocer's Daughter is the third album by British new wave/sophisti-pop band the Blow Monkeys, originally released in 1987.

The album's title is a reference to Prime Minister of the United Kingdom, Margaret Thatcher, whose Conservative government was unpopular with left wing, pro-Labour Party music acts of the 1980s (including the Blow Monkeys), some of whom joined the Red Wedge movement as part of their political activism.

Some songs on the album reflect dissatisfaction with the political situation in the UK at the time. After a gradual shift towards a slicker, pop-oriented style, the Blow Monkeys also introduced a dance beat, which became a defining feature of the band's later releases.

History
The band's record label RCA invested heavily in the promotion of She Was Only a Grocer's Daughter by issuing it in several different editions (e.g. the vinyl LP included 10 songs and a thick photo book, while the CD was released in two versions, with bonus tracks and alternative track listings, as well as slightly modified song titles).

She Was Only a Grocer's Daughter peaked at No. 20 in the UK Albums Chart in April 1987 (only their 1989 greatest hits compilation, Choices – The Singles Collection, fared better, reaching No. 5). It was the band's only album to spawn four UK top 75 singles. The opening track, "It Doesn't Have to Be This Way", proved to be their most successful single, reaching No. 5 in the UK Singles Chart.

The album's other three singles were: the suggestive ballad "Out with Her" (No. 30); "Some Kind of Wonderful" (No. 67); "(Celebrate) The Day After You". The last of these was a duet with Curtis Mayfield, which was remixed for the single version. The song was banned by the BBC as it was released during a general election and, as such, was deemed to be too political.

Track listing
Words and music by Dr. Robert.

 "It Doesn't Have to Be This Way" – 4:00
 "Some Kind of Wonderful" – 3:33
 "Out with Her" – 4:40
 "How Long Can a Bad Thing Last?" – 4:07
 "Man at the End of His Tether" – 4:00
 "Rise Above" – 4:53
 "The Day After You (Celebrate)" – 5:00
 "Checking Out" – 4:58
 "Don't Give It Up" – 5:46
 "Cash" – 6:01
 "Beautiful Child" – 3:50
 "This Is the Way It Has to Be" (CD only) – 6:05
 "The Grantham Grizzler" (CD only) – 7:20

BMG / Camden 2002 re-release

 "It Doesn't Have to Be This Way"
 "Some Kind of Wonderful"
 "Out with Her"
 "How Long Can a Bad Thing Last?"
 "Man at the End of His Tether"
 "Rise Above"
 "(Celebrate) The Day After You"
 "Checking Out"
 "Don't Give It Up"
 "Cash"
 "Beautiful Child"
 "It Doesn't Have to Be This Way" [Long]
 "(Celebrate) The Day After You" [Unity Mix]
 "Smile on Her Face" (Sweet Murder)
 "Grantham Grizzler"

Personnel
Adapted from the album's liner notes.

Musicians
The Blow Monkeys
 Dr. Robert – vocals, guitar, string arrangements
 Neville Henry – saxophone
 Tony Kiley – Drums
 Mick Anker – bass guitar

Other musicians

 Michael Baker – keyboards, string arrangements
 The Borneo Horn Section – horns
 Tim Bryant – backing vocals
 Craig Derry – backing vocals
 Will Downing – backing vocals
 Grayson Hughes – backing vocals
 Jimmy Jackson – backing vocals
 Axel Kroel – keyboards, string arrangements
 Sylvia Mason-James – backing vocals
 John Mealing – string arrangements
 Cindy Mizelle – backing vocals
 Gary Rottger – keyboards
 Phil Roy – backing vocals
 Ira Siegel – guitar
 Roger Stuart – backing vocals
 Steve Sydelnick – additional percussion
 Benita Turner – backing vocals
 Marius de Vries – keyboards
 Audrey Wheeler – backing vocals
 Peter Wilson – string arrangements
 Gavyn Wright – strings
 Helen Wright – strings
 Paula Yates – backing vocals

Technical
 Produced by Michael Baker, with help from the Axeman
 Recording engineer: Douglas Gramma
 Mixed by Brian "Chuck" New, Bob Kraushaar, Douglas Gramma, Rafe McKenna
 Recorded at D&D Studios (New York), The Point Studios, Trident Studios, Swanyard Studios, Westside Studios (London)
 Programmed at Synthnett Studios (New York), The Point Studios (London)
 Mixed at Battery Studios, Sarm West, Red Bus Studios
 Nick Knight: photography
 Sleeve design: Mainartery, London

Singles from the album
 "It Doesn't Have to Be This Way" (1987) (UK Singles Chart: Number 5)
 "Out with Her" (1987) (UK Singles Chart: Number 30)
 "(Celebrate) The Day After You" (1987) (UK Singles Chart: Number 52)
 "Some Kind of Wonderful" (1987) (UK Singles Chart: Number 67)

Charts

Release details

References

External links
 Fencat Online: Dr Robert's Official Website.

1987 albums
The Blow Monkeys albums
Ariola Records albums
RCA Records albums
Political music albums by English artists